The Black Dirt Sessions is the third album by American indie-rock band Deer Tick.  Recorded over a year earlier, the Black Dirt Sessions was released on June 8, 2010 on Partisan Records.

Track listing

References

External links
 Official Website
 Deer Tick @ Partisan Records
 MySpace

2010 albums
Deer Tick (band) albums
Partisan Records albums